Whalley Range is an urban area in Blackburn, Lancashire. The area is a community with almost all residents being of Indian or Pakistani heritage. Houses in the area are predominantly terraced and go up on a hill in a typical Pennine mill town style.

Geography of Blackburn with Darwen